Dave's Picks Volume 4 is a three-CD live album by the rock band the Grateful Dead.  It contains the complete concert recorded on September 24, 1976 at the College of William & Mary in Williamsburg, Virginia. It was released on November 1, 2012.

Dave's Picks Volume 4 is the fourth in the Dave's Picks series of Grateful Dead archival releases, the successor to the Road Trips series, and was produced as a limited edition of 12,000 numbered copies.

Part of the show was previously released on the Spirit of '76 bonus disc included in some copies of Live at the Cow Palace. Music from the concert performed the following night was released on Dick's Picks Volume 20.

Track listing

Disc 1
First set:
"Promised Land" (Chuck Berry) – 4:41
"Deal" (Jerry Garcia, Robert Hunter) – 5:07
"Cassidy" (Bob Weir, John Perry Barlow) – 4:34
"Sugaree"  (Garcia, Hunter) – 10:25
"Looks Like Rain" (Weir, Barlow) – 7:53
"Row Jimmy" (Garcia, Hunter) – 9:48
"Big River" (Johnny Cash) – 5:33
"Tennessee Jed" (Garcia, Hunter) – 8:55

Disc 2
"Playing in the Band" > (Weir, Mickey Hart, Hunter) – 11:53
"Supplication" > (Weir, Barlow) – 4:55
"Playing in the Band" (Weir, Hart, Hunter) – 4:43
Second set:
"Might as Well"  (Garcia, Hunter) – 7:36
"Samson and Delilah" (traditional, arranged by Weir) – 7:02
"Loser" (Garcia, Hunter) – 8:06
"New Minglewood Blues" (traditional, arranged by Grateful Dead) – 4:30
Note

Disc 3
"Help on the Way" > (Garcia, Hunter) – 5:06
"Slipknot!" > (Garcia, Phil Lesh, Weir, Bill Kreutzmann, Keith Godchaux) – 5:07
"Drums" > (Hart, Kreutzmann) – 5:36
"Slipknot!" >  (Garcia, Lesh, Weir, Kreutzmann, K. Godchaux) – 5:28
"Franklin's Tower" > (Garcia, Kreutzmann, Hunter) – 8:12
"The Music Never Stopped" > (Weir, Barlow) – 5:49
"Stella Blue" (Garcia, Hunter) – 7:35
"Around and Around" (Berry) – 6:54
Encore:
"U.S. Blues" (Garcia, Hunter) – 5:56

Personnel

Grateful Dead
Jerry Garcia – lead guitar, vocals
Donna Jean Godchaux - vocals
Keith Godchaux – keyboards
Mickey Hart - drums
Bill Kreutzmann – drums
Phil Lesh – electric bass
Bob Weir – rhythm guitar, vocals

Production
Produced by Grateful Dead
Produced for release by David Lemieux
Executive producer: Mark Pinkus
Associate producer: Doran Tyson
CD mastering: Jeffrey Norman
Recording: Dan Healy
Art direction and design: Steve Vance
Cover art: Scott McDougall
Tape research: Michael Wesley Johnson
Archival research: Nicholas Meriwether
Photos: James R. Anderson
Liner notes essay "Higher Ed with the Dead": Nicholas Meriwether

References

2012 live albums
Rhino Entertainment live albums
04